Music instrument technology refers to the construction of instruments and the way they have changed over time. Such change has produced modern instruments that are considerably different from their historical antecedents.

An example is the way in which many instruments commonly associated with a modern symphony orchestra are markedly different from the same instruments for which European composers were composing music centuries ago.

Such changes include the addition of piston valves to brass instruments, the design of more complex fingering systems for woodwind instruments such as the flute, and the standardization of the family of orchestral string instruments.

Many advancements were made in music instrument technology during the Middle Ages and 19th Century. The introduction of copper smelting allowed for trumpets, organ pipes, and slides to be constructed with sheet metal which had a smooth texture and consistency in thickness, allowing for more range of tones and sounds. Improvements in molding and casting during the 19th Century allowed for technological advancement to pianos. While originally constructed with wooden frames, limiting the amount of sound that could be produced, pianos began to be constructed of one-piece iron frames. This provided a more amplified volume from the instrument and allowed musicians to use less force when playing the instrument. Improvements in drum tuning were also established at this time. The "Dresden" model of tuning, involving steel technology and employing a foot petal with ratchet in order to attach the device to the timpani, was invented by Carl Pittrich. This technology allowed for timpani to be tuned much faster by the musician. The Dresden tuners could also be added onto existing timpani, allowing symphonies to continue using their existing instruments while still employing this new technology. Lastly, the 19th century also lead to the development of valves, and when added in to the construction of trumpets and horns, they allowed for the instruments to express a broader range to the harmonic series of notes being produced.

Some of this technology represents patentable advancements in the musical instrument industry.  See Musical Instrument Patent of Week

See also
 Organology
 New Interfaces for Musical Expression
 Category:Musical instrument makers
 Category:Musical instrument manufacturing companies

References

Bowles, Edmund A. "The Impact of Technology on Musical Instruments." Cosmos Club. N.p., n.d. Web 16 Oct. 2013.

Technology
Music technology